The Yasar Dogu Tournament 2004, was a wrestling event held in Ankara, Turkey between 12 and 14 March 2004. This tournament was held as 32nd.

This international tournament includes competition includes competition in men's  freestyle wrestling. This ranking tournament was held in honor of the two time Olympic Champion, Yaşar Doğu.

Medal table

Medal overview

Men's freestyle

Participating nations

References 

Yasar Dogu 2004
2004 in sport wrestling
Sports competitions in Ankara
Yaşar Doğu Tournament
International wrestling competitions hosted by Turkey